BMC Nursing is an open access peer-reviewed nursing journal published by BioMed Central covering all aspects of nursing research, training, education, and practice.

Publishers of Nursing journals have traditionally been slow to move to online and open access publishing, meaning BMC Nursing's launch in 2002 has made it one of the most widely known open access journals in the field.

See also 

 List of nursing journals

References 

BioMed Central academic journals
General nursing journals
Publications established in 2002
English-language journals
Creative Commons Attribution-licensed journals